Nebamun (fl. )  was a middle-ranking official "scribe and grain accountant" during the period of the New Kingdom in ancient Egypt. He worked at the vast temple complex near Thebes (now Luxor) where the state-god Amun was worshipped. His name was translated as "My Lord is Amun", and his association with the temple, coupled with the importance of grain supplies to Egypt, meant that he was a person of considerable practical importance, though not of the highest rank.

Nebamun is known today because of the 1820 discovery of the richly-decorated Tomb of Nebamun on the west bank of the Nile at Thebes. Although the exact location of that tomb is now lost, a number of wall paintings from the tomb were acquired by the British Museum where they are now on display. They are considered to be one of that museum's greatest treasures.

Gallery

See also
 List of ancient Egyptian scribes

References

External links 

 Nebamun: Illustrated description of tomb and its erotic dancers

Year of birth missing
Year of death missing
 
Ancient Egyptian scribes